George Houghton is a former property businessman.

George Houghton may also refer to:

George Hendric Houghton (1820–1897), American clergyman
George William Houghton (1905–1993), golf writer and cartoonist
George L. Houghton (1841–1917), American soldier in the American Civil War